Gilston is a village and civil parish in the East Hertfordshire district of Hertfordshire, England. It is located a little over one mile north of the town of Harlow in the neighbouring county of Essex. Together with the nearby hamlet of Eastwick, it forms the parish council of Eastwick and Gilston. At the 2001 Census, the population was 180, and 228 at the 2011 Census.

The name derives from Gedel or Gydel, an Old English personal name, and tun, meaning farm or settlement.

The Parish Church of St Mary dates from the 13th century, and is Grade I listed.

See also
 The Hundred Parishes

References

External links 
 Gilston (A Guide to Old Hertfordshire)
 History of Gilston in East Hertfordshire | Map and description
 UK & Ireland Genealogy - Gilston

Villages in Hertfordshire
Civil parishes in Hertfordshire
East Hertfordshire District